Mohd Hafiza bin Rofa (born 8 July 1996) is a Malaysian professional motorcycle racer.

Career statistics

Grand Prix motorcycle racing

By season

Races by year

ARRC Underbone 150

Races by year
(key) (Races in bold indicate pole position; races in italics indicate fastest lap)

References

External links
http://www.motogp.com/en/riders/Hafiza+Rofa

Living people
1996 births
Malaysian motorcycle racers
Moto3 World Championship riders